Gallai is the largest village of the Mashwanis community in Sirikot, Haripur District in Khyber Pakhtunkhwa province of Pakistan.

Populated places in Haripur District